Knutsford is a market town in Cheshire East, England. Historically, its two main streets are Princess Street and King Street, which still contain 17th and 18th-century houses and shops, and Georgian buildings. The prosperity of the town grew with the arrival of the railway, and this resulted in the building of large houses to the south of the town, including the eccentric villas designed by Richard Harding Watt.

This list contains all the structures included in the National Heritage List for England in Knutsford. There is one listed at Grade I, the 17th-century Brook Street Chapel, which is the burial place of the novelist Mrs Gaskell. Two Anglican churches, St John the Baptist, dating from the 18th century and Neoclassical in style, and the 19th-century Gothic Revival Church of St Cross, are listed at Grade II*, together with five other buildings. The rest of the listed buildings are in Grade II.

Key

Listed buildings

See also
Listed buildings in Bexton
Listed buildings in Marthall
Listed buildings in Mere
Listed buildings in Mobberley
Listed buildings in Ollerton
Listed buildings in Tabley Superior
Listed buildings in Tatton
Listed buildings in Toft

References
Citations

Sources

Listed buildings in the Borough of Cheshire East
Lists of listed buildings in Cheshire
Knutsford